In computer science, derived type can mean:

 a composite data type, one built out of other types
 a subtype
 a derived class